Guy M'Bongo (born 23 September 1968) is a basketball player from the Central African Republic. He competed at the 1988 Summer Olympics with the Central African Republic national basketball team. He later attended St. Francis Xavier University where he starred on the 1993 National Championship team.

References

1968 births
Living people
Central African Republic men's basketball players
Olympic basketball players of the Central African Republic
Basketball players at the 1988 Summer Olympics
St. Francis Xavier University alumni
Central African Republic expatriate sportspeople in Canada